Oslaria viridifera, the green oslaria, is a moth in the family Noctuidae (the owlet moths). The species was first described by Augustus Radcliffe Grote in 1882. It is found in North America.

References

Further reading

External links
 

Amphipyrinae
Articles created by Qbugbot
Moths described in 1882